MadgeTech, Inc. is a data logger company located in Warner, New Hampshire, United States. MadgeTech designs, engineers, manufactures and sells data loggers. It was founded in October 1996.

History 
Norman Carlson founded the company in 1996.

In 2014 the company had 54 employees and designed and produced the products in New Hampshire.

Products 
The company designs, builds and tests sensors that monitor and measure everything from humidity, the carbon dioxide level and temperature to speed and pressure. For example, it  built humidity monitors for the Sistine Chapel in Vatican City to protect priceless works of art against damage from their environment. It makes data loggers so geothermal engineers in the Philippines know how much steam their systems generate. Furthermore, the company makes sensors to monitor the storage temperature of meat, and its newest product measures carbon dioxide to ensure proper ventilation. The products are used all over the world. The MadgeTech Data Logger Software provides device management and a wealth of reporting tools. MadgeTech secure data logger software is also available to serve more strictly regulated industries that need to comply with 21 CFR Part11 requirements and IQ/OQ/PQ guidelines.

The production process is entirely located at their headquarters in Warner,  New Hampshire.

MadgeTech data loggers have been used by NASA.

References

External links 
Cote, Mike. "Fiorina thinks entrepreneurs could use a little help", The Union Leader, Manchester, 2 May 2015. Retrieved on 28 July 2015.
  MadgeTech Named June "Innovation Rocks" Award Winner

External links 

 Official website

Warner, New Hampshire
Companies based in Merrimack County, New Hampshire
Instrument-making corporations